Tashan Dinnachi L. Oakley-Boothe  (born 14 February 2000) is an English professional footballer who plays as a midfielder for EFL League One side Lincoln City on loan from Stoke City.

Career

Tottenham Hotspur
Oakley-Boothe was born in Lambeth and attended Canonbury Primary School and Highbury Grove School. He joined the Tottenham Hotspur academy team on 1 July 2017. He was called up to senior team by Mauricio Pochettino for pre-season tour. On 22 July 2017, Oakley-Boothe made his first senior appearance for Tottenham Hotspur against Paris Saint-Germain in 2017 International Champions Cup pre-season match.

He made his first-team debut for Tottenham in a 1–0 win against Barnsley in the EFL Cup on 19 September 2017, replacing Dele Alli in added time. Oakley-Boothe remained with Spurs' under-23 side in 2018–19 and 2019–20. During this time he played in the EFL Trophy where he scored his first senior goal in a 1–1 draw with Colchester United.

Oakley-Boothe rejected a new contract offer from Spurs in January 2020.

Stoke City
Oakley-Boothe joined Stoke City on 31 January 2020 signing a three-and-a-half year contract for an undisclosed fee. Oakley-Boothe made his debut for Stoke on 7 March 2020 in a 5–1 victory against Hull City where he provided the assist for Nick Powell for Stoke's fifth goal. He made his first start for the club the final day of the season on 22 July 2020 in a 4–1 win against Nottingham Forest. Oakley-Boothe struggled to make much impact in 2020–21 as he made 21 appearances, of which he started six. He suffered a season ending back injury at the start of April

Lincoln City (loan)
On 27 June 2022, Oakley-Boothe joined EFL League One side Lincoln City on a season-long loan. He made his Lincoln debut on the opening day of the season against Exeter City..

International career
Oakley-Booth was born in England and is of Jamaican descent. In May 2017, Oakley-Boothe was part of the England national under-17 football team that reached the final of the 2017 UEFA European Under-17 Championship, playing five games. On 16 May 2017, Oakley-Boothe suffered a head injury in their semi-final game against Turkey national under-17 football team that caused a lengthy stoppage and ruled him out of the final.

Oakley-Boothe was also part of the England team that competed in the 2017 FIFA U-17 World Cup in India. On 28 October 2017, he played in the final and helped the team beat Spain 5–2 and win the FIFA's U-17 World Cup.

Career statistics

Honours
England U17
2017 FIFA U-17 World Cup winner
UEFA European Under-17 Championship runner-up: 2017

References

External links

England profile at The Football Association

2000 births
Living people
Footballers from the London Borough of Lambeth
English footballers
England youth international footballers
English people of Jamaican descent
Association football midfielders
Tottenham Hotspur F.C. players
Stoke City F.C. players
Lincoln City F.C. players
Black British sportspeople
English Football League players